Silvia Gonaone Makgone (born September 6, 1963 in Aminuis) is a Namibian politician and teacher who is the incumbent deputy minister of urban and rural development.

Early life and education 
Makgone holds five tertiary education degrees in education and human resources, among them a bachelor's of arts and a bachelor of education. 

She worked as teacher at Mokganedi Tlhabanello Senior Secondary School in Drimiopsis in the Omaheke Region from 1987 and was promoted to principal of Mokaleng RC Combined School in 1996. She also served as principal of other schools.

Career
In 2010, Makgone became a member of parliament on a SWAPO ticket. 

In February 2013, after the death of Abraham Iyambo, she was appointed deputy minister of education. Makgone replaced David Namwandi who was promoted to minister.

References

Living people
1963 births
People from Omaheke Region
SWAPO politicians
Government ministers of Namibia